Nam tok mu is one type of Lao and Thai salad. It is a native food of the northeast of Thailand (Isan) and it is a popular food because it is easy to cook. It is made from grilled pork that is cut into thin pieces and flavored with chili powder, chopped shallots, ground roasted rice, lime juice, and fish sauce. It tastes sour, salty, and spicy like larb. The ingredients of nam tok mu can be found locally in Thailand and it is very cheap.

Side dishes
The side dishes of nam tok mu are vegetables such as lettuce, cabbage, and peas. Nam tok mu is usually eaten with sticky rice when it is a main meal.

See also
 List of pork dishes

Notes

References 
ต้ม ยำ ทำ แกง รสเด็ด, สุนัน หามนตรี, 2555, Pailin Book Publishing, page 106
ต้ม ยำ ทำ แกง รสเด็ด, สุนัน หามนตรี, 2555, Pailin Book Publishing, page 107

Thai cuisine